North East Cambridgeshire is a constituency represented in the House of Commons of the UK Parliament since 2010 by Steve Barclay, a Conservative.

Constituency profile
This large and rural seat is in The Fens and has a significant farming and food production sector. Residents are less wealthy and healthy than the UK average.

History
Clement Freud, former Liberal MP for Isle of Ely from 1973, represented the seat from its creation in 1983 until 1987, when he was defeated by the Conservative Malcolm Moss and since then it has been served by one other Conservative MP, namely Steve Barclay, first elected in 2010. On 16 November 2018, Barclay was appointed Secretary of State for Exiting the European Union.

Boundaries and boundary changes 
1983–1997: The District of Fenland, the District of East Cambridgeshire wards of Downham, Haddenham, Littleport, Stretham, Sutton, and Witchford, and the City of Peterborough wards of Eye, Newborough, and Thorney.

The seat was created for the 1983 general election which followed on from the merger under the Local Government Act 1972, of the two administrative counties of Huntingdon and Peterborough and Cambridgeshire and Isle of Ely to form the non-metropolitan county of Cambridgeshire, with effect from 1 April 1974.  It was formed from the abolished constituency of Isle of Ely, with the exception of the city of Ely itself, which was included in the new County Constituency of South East Cambridgeshire. The three City of Peterborough wards were transferred from the Borough Constituency of Peterborough.

1997–2010: The District of Fenland, the District of East Cambridgeshire wards of Downham, Littleport, and Sutton, and the City of Peterborough wards of Eye, Newborough, and Thorney.

Minor loss to South East Cambridgeshire.

2010–present: The District of Fenland, and the District of East Cambridgeshire wards of Downham Villages, Littleport East, Littleport West, and Sutton.

The City of Peterborough wards were returned to the constituency thereof. No other changes.

Members of Parliament

Elections

Elections in the 2010s

Elections in the 2000s

Elections in the 1990s

Elections in the 1980s

See also 
 List of parliamentary constituencies in Cambridgeshire

Notes

References

Parliamentary constituencies in Cambridgeshire
Constituencies of the Parliament of the United Kingdom established in 1983